Kadambathur is a state assembly constituency in Thiruvallur district, Tamil Nadu, India. It exists from 1962 to 1971.

Members of Legislative Assembly

Election results

1971

1967

1962

References

External links
 

Former assembly constituencies of Tamil Nadu
Tiruvallur district